Walter Aston, 7th Lord Aston of Forfar, succeeded his brother Philip Aston, 6th Lord Aston of Forfar, as Lord Aston of Forfar in the peerage of Scotland in 1755.

He died without a direct heir in 1763, and thus his title passed to his cousin, Walter Aston, 8th Lord Aston of Forfar.

See also
Lord Aston of Forfar

References
 Burke's Dormant & Extinct Peerages, originally published in London in 1883, reprinted by Genealogical Publishing Company, Baltimore, 1996. Pages 13 & 14.έ

Aston of Forfar, Walter Aston, 7th Lord